JNI is the Java Native Interface, a Java programming framework.

JNI or jni may also refer to:

 Junín Airport (IATA code), serving Junín, Buenos Aires, Argentina
 Janji language (ISO 639:jni), a Kainji language of Nigeria
 Jama'atu Nasril Islam, an umbrella group for the Nigerian Muslims community

See also
 Jama'at Nasr al-Islam wal Muslimin (JNIM), a militant jihadist organisation in the Maghreb and West Africa